Coleophora asirensis is a moth of the family Coleophoridae that is endemic to Saudi Arabia.

References

External links

asirensis
Moths of Asia
Endemic fauna of Saudi Arabia
Moths described in 1990